Castle Gate or Castlegate may refer to:
 The gate of a castle (such as a portcullis)

Town or part of a town
 Castlegate, Aberdeen in Aberdeen, Scotland
 Castlegate Quarter in Sheffield, England
 Castle Gate, Utah, a ghost town in Utah, United States
 Castle Gate, Cornwall, a hamlet between St Ives and Penzance

Shopping centre
 Castle Gate (Dudley shopping centre) in Dudley, England
 Castle Gate Shopping Centre (Shrewsbury) in Shrewsbury, England
 Castlegate shopping centre in Stockton-on-Tees

Street
 Castlegate (Sheffield), a street in Sheffield, England
 Castle Gate, Nottingham
 Castlegate, York, a street in York, England
 Castlegate Drive, San Jose, a street in San Jose, United States

Other
 Castlegate bunker in Germany
 Castle Gate Mine disaster in 1924
 Castle Gate (rock formation), which the town was named for

See also
 St Mary's Church, Castlegate, York